Houlletia is a genus of large-growing epiphytic orchids native to Mexico, and possibly also Guatemala through Central America to Bolivia. was established with the publication by Brogniartt of Houlletia brocklehurstiana in 1841. The genus is named in honor of orchid collector and grower M. Houllet, French orchid collector in Brazil, later the director of the Botanic Jardin des Plantes in Paris, 19th century.

Environment 
They are found growing epiphytically and terrestrially on embankments in cool, humid, wet areas, 1,000-2,200 m elevation.

Classification and description 
Gerlach (1999) places the genus Houlletia within the "Acineta-Verwandtschaftsgruppe," allied with Acineta, Lueddemannia and Vasqueziella within the larger Stanhopeinae Alliance.

Whitten, Williams, and Chase distinguish the Houlletia clade among the Stanhopeinae, comprising Horichia, Houlletia, Paphinia, Schlimmia, and Trevoria. They write:

"As presently defined, Houlletia consists of two morphologically distinct groups. The group containing H. brockelhurstiana (the type species), H. tigrina, H. odoratissima (Linden ex Lindl.), and H. juruenensis (Hoehne) have open, resupinate flowers that are heavily spotted in red-brown. The epichile is triangular and the hypochile bears a pair of curved, acute projections; the lip shares many features of the lip of Paphinia. The viscidium is narrow, approximately the same width of the long stipe, and the pollinaria are deposited on the bee's scutellum.

In contrast, the group containing H. sanderi, H. wallisii, H. clarae (Schltr.), and H. lowiana (Rchb.f). has globose, nonresupinate flowers that are white to yellow, mostly unspotted, and borne on an erect inflorescence. The epichile is rectangular or ovate (not triangular), and the lateral projections on the hypochile are broad instead of acute. The pollinarium has a broad, concave viscidium."

The plants have ovoid, ridged pseudobulbs, each bearing 2-4 large, pleated leaves. The inflorescences begin from the base of the pseudobulbs and are always pendant, with fleshy, showy flowers hanging downward ("nodding") on a simple raceme. The dorsal sepal is free and the lateral sepals form a short mentum with the column foot. The petals are similar to the dorsal sepal but smaller. The lip is deeply 3-lobed, the lateral lobes are upcurved and the mid-lobe is spreading. The anther is imperfectly two-celled and there are two waxy pollinia, cleft, with viscidium and a prominent stipe.

Note that in 1999, E. Luckel & H. Fessel published the new genus Jennyella "to accommodate the globose, white flowered taxa." They segregate four species previously attributed to Houlletia into the new genus Jennyella: H. clarae (Schlechter 1924); H. kalbreyeriana (Kraenzlin 1920); H. lowiana (Rchb. f.); and H. sanderi (Rolfe 1910).

Intergeneric hybrids 
Houllora (Gongora × Houlletia), in Orchid Rev., 108(1234), IPNI ID 1014858-1, February 7, 2003

References 

 Brogniart (1841) "Houlletia brocklehurstiana," in: Annales des Sciences Naturelles; Botanique, sér. 2, 15: 37
 International Plant Names Index (IPNI)

External links 
 The Stanhopea Pages website /Houlletia.

 
Stanhopeinae genera
Epiphytic orchids
Taxa named by Adolphe-Théodore Brongniart